Abu Musa is a disputed island in the Persian Gulf near the Strait of Hormuz.

Abu Musa may also refer to:

Places
Abumusa (City), The capital city of Abumusa County, Hormozgan Province, Iran
Abumusa County, a county in Hormozgan Province in Iran
Abu Musa Airport, Iran

People
Abu Musa, Abu Musa Ashaari, an important figure in early Islamic history
Abu Musa Mombasa, Pakistani member of the Somali militant paramilitary group al-Shabaab
Said al-Muragha (1927–2013), Palestinian militant better known as Abu Musa
Abu Mosa (press officer) (died 2014), press officer for the Islamic State
Abu Salah Musa (born 1981), Bangladeshi kabaddi player